Ahmed Sarir (born 25 December 1962) is a Moroccan boxer. He competed in the men's super heavyweight event at the 1992 Summer Olympics.

References

1962 births
Living people
Moroccan male boxers
Olympic boxers of Morocco
Boxers at the 1992 Summer Olympics
Place of birth missing (living people)
Super-heavyweight boxers